Erodium brachycarpum is a species of flowering plant in the geranium family known by the common names hairy-pitted stork's-bill and shortfruit stork's bill. It is native to southern Europe but it is known elsewhere as an introduced species and often a weed, such as the west coast of the United States where it is widespread in California and Oregon.

Description
This annual herb grows up to about half a meter tall and bears lobed, hairy, petioled leaves with blades up to 10 centimeters wide. The inflorescence is an umbel of lavender flowers with five petals each about a centimeter long and often dark-striped. The fruit has a hairy base just over half a centimeter long and a style which may reach 8 centimeters in length.

This plant is very similar to Erodium botrys and is often overlooked as such, but brachycarpum is a smaller plant overall. Flowers are about a third the size of botrys, and the style is smaller than 80 mm rather than larger. Minor differences exist in the seeds themselves, as well.

References

External links 
Jepson Manual Treatment
Photo gallery

brachycarpum